Tintina, a village in Argentina
Tintina Fault, a fault line in North America
Tintina Trench, a valley in Canada
Tintina (rock), a Mars rock

See also